The Ram–Crusader Cup is the name of the trophy awarded to the winner of the annual football game between the Fordham Rams and the Holy Cross Crusaders. Both schools are members of the Patriot League.

Origin of the Cup

The Ram–Crusader Cup was instituted in 1951 to honor the memory of Major Frank W. Cavanaugh. The idea for the Cup came from William P. Walsh, at the time, a Holy Cross undergrad.  Walsh was working at a summer camp headed by then Fordham head coach, Ed Danowski, when hearing that the Rams and Crusaders were restarting their series.  Despite being enrolled at Holy Cross, Walsh grew up on Long Island as a Fordham football fan.  The summer camp counselor approached his boss and suggested inaugurating a trophy in honor of Major Frank Cavanaugh.  The "Iron Major” spent three seasons as head coach of Holy Cross (1903-1905) where he had a 19-10-2 record, and six at Fordham (1927-1932) where he had a 34-14-4 record and also elevated the program to college football's highest level.  Danowski, who had captained Cavanaugh's last team while a quarterback for the Rams, looked forward to the trophy game and enthusiastically predicted Fordham would “pin back the ears” of the Crusaders.  Instead, it was Holy Cross easily prevailing in a 54-20 blowout.  John Cavanaugh, son of the Hall of Fame coach, later made the post-game trophy presentation to Holy Cross.  Contests staged in 1952, '53 and '54 were all far closer affairs but each also ended with Holy Cross victories.  When Fordham terminated their football program following the 1954 season the Cup was put on hiatus.

Return of the Cup

Although Holy Cross never terminated their own program, from about the early 1950s to the early 1980s they played a mostly regional schedule at a lower Division I level with only mixed results. In 1982 they moved down to I-AA status where, under Coach Rick E. Carter and later Mark Duffner, fortunes quickly changed.  From 1982 to 1991 they finished with a Top-20 national ranking every year but one. Meanwhile, after years without a team, and later, years as a club team, followed by years as a D-III team, Fordham finally elevated their own program to the I-AA level for the 1989 season.  The Rams officially joined the Patriot League (then still known as the Colonial League) the following season thus allowing them to resume their series with Holy Cross.

36 years had passed since their last gridiron encounter but once again it was Holy Cross dominating with a 48-0 conquest.  The Worcester school kept their monopoly on the "Iron Major Cup" until Fordham finally broke through with a win in 1995.  It started a run where the Rams won 15 of 22.  Still, Holy Cross leads the Ram–Crusader Cup series, 23–15.  They also lead the all-time series 32-25-2 which dates back to 1902, a year before Cavanaugh began patrolling Holy Cross’ sidelines.

The 2016 game was played on November 12, at Yankee Stadium, where in front of 21,000+ fans, Fordham routed Holy Cross, 54–14. This marked Fordham's first game at The Stadium since 1946 and the first encounter between the schools at a professional venue since 1954. Previous Cups were staged in Ireland (1991) and Bermuda (1995).

Game results

See also
 List of NCAA college football rivalry games

References

College football rivalry trophies in the United States
Fordham Rams football
Holy Cross Crusaders football